Rank comparison chart of Non-commissioned officer and enlisted ranks for air forces of North and South American states.

Other ranks

See also
Air force officer rank insignia
Comparative air force officer ranks of the Americas

References

Americas
Air force ranks
Military comparisons